Soshnevo is a rural locality (a village) in Soshnevskoye Rural Settlement, Ustyuzhensky District, Vologda Oblast, Russia. The population was 22 as of 2002.

Geography 
Ramenye is the nearest rural locality.

References 

Rural localities in Ustyuzhensky District